Patricide (or paternal homicide) is the act of killing one's own father or stepfather. The word patricide derives from the Latin word pater (father) and the suffix -cida (cutter or killer). Patricide is a sub-form of parricide, which is defined as an act of killing a close relative. In many cultures and religions patricide was considered one of the worst sins. For example, according to Marcus Tullius Cicero, in the Roman Republic it was the only crime for which the civilian could be sentenced to death.

Patricides in myths and religions
Patricide is a common motif that is prevalent throughout many religions and cultures, and particularly in the mythology and religion of Greek culture. Some key examples of patricide from various cultures are included as follows:
 Apsu, in the Babylonian creation epic the Enûma Elish, was killed by his son Ea in the struggle for supremacy among the gods.
 In the mythology of the neighboring Mesopotamian Hurrian people the storm god Teshub kills his father Kumarbi, sometimes jointly with his grandfather Anu in reciprocity for an attempted patricide by Kumarbi.
 In the Greek creation epic, first recorded in Hesiod's Theogony, Cronus was jealous of his father Uranus' power as ruler of the universe. Cronus thus killed or castrated his father. Cronus, in turn, was overthrown by his own son, Zeus.
 Oedipus was fated to kill his father, a king, and marry his mother. His parents attempted to prevent this by leaving him on the side of a mountain as an infant. He was found and raised by a shepherd. Once grown, Oedipus meets his father while his father is traveling, but not knowing who he is, ends up killing him. He then unknowingly marries his mother to become king, ultimately fulfilling the prophecy.
 Pelias was killed by his daughters, who were deceived by Medea into thinking he could be resurrected.
 In the Hindu epic Mahabharata, Babruvahana killed his father Arjun, but Arjun was brought back to life by his wife, the snake goddess Uloopi.
 In Chinese belief, people who commit patricide (or matricide) will be killed by a lightning strike as a punishment from filial and warrior deity Erlang Shen.
 In Norse mythology, Fafnir murdered his father Hreidmar to gain the cursed golden ring of Andvari that he had obtained. Some versions say that his brother Regin helped him.
In the legend of West Java, Indonesia, Tangkuban Perahu, Sangkuriang, is said to have killed his father, who was a dog, because he did not get any prey.

Known or suspected historical patricides 

 Tukulti-Ninurta I (r. 1243–1207 BC), Assyrian king, was killed by his own son after sacking Babylon.
 Sennacherib (r. 704–681 BC), Assyrian king, was killed by two of his sons for his desecration of Babylon.
 Bimbisara (r. 543–491 BC), king of Magadha, was executed by his son Ajatashatru.
 Ajatashatru (r. 492–c. 460 BC), king of Magadha, was killed by his son Udayabhadra.
 King Kassapa I (AD 473–495) creator of the Sigiriya citadel of ancient Sri Lanka killed his father king Dhatusena for the throne.
 King Chlodoric the Parricide (d. 509) killed his father Sigobert the Lame, a Frankish king, for the throne. He himself was later killed by Clovis.
 Emperor Zhu Yougui (888?–913) of China killed his father Zhu Wen (852–912).
 Emperor Yang of Sui (569–618) in Chinese history allegedly killed his father, Emperor Wen of Sui (541–604).
 Ulugh Beg (1394–1449) of the Timurid Empire was killed by his son Abdal-Latif Mirza, who also killed his own brother 'Abd al-'Aziz a few days later. He as such became the ruler of the empire, only to be killed by his cousin Abdallah Mirza six months later.
 Samvel killed his father Vahan, who converted to Christianity and joined the Zoroastrian Persian Empire.
 Rana Kumbha (r. 1438–1468), the King of Mewar Kingdom, in India was killed by his son Udai, who then succeeded him becoming Rana Udai Singh I of Mewar. Udai was killed five years later by his younger brother Raimal who wanted avenge his father's death.
 Jagaddeva (r. 1150), the Chahamana king of India, killed his father Arnoraja.
 Beatrice Cenci (1577–1599), Italian noblewoman who killed her father after he imprisoned and raped her. She was condemned and beheaded for the crime along with her brother and her stepmother in 1599.
 Amangkurat I, the fourth Sultan of Mataram (r. 1645–1677), was allegedly poisoned by his son Raden Mas Rahmat.
 Iyasus I of Ethiopia (1682–1706), one of the great warrior emperors of Ethiopia, was deposed by his son Tekle Haymanot in 1706 and subsequently assassinated.
 Ajit Singh of Marwar (1679–1724) was murdered by his sons Bakht Singh and Abhai Singh in 1724 after the two plotted to take his place as Maharaja of Marwar.
 Richard Dadd (1817–1886), the English artist, murdered his father in 1843 following the onset of psychiatric illness.
 Milas K. Young (1812–1875), a farmer and politician in Grant County, Wisconsin, was murdered by his eldest son in a dispute over the family estate.  His son and wife both subsequently committed suicide.
 Lizzie Borden (1860–1927) allegedly killed her father and her stepmother with a hatchet in Fall River, Massachusetts, in 1892. She was acquitted, but her innocence is still disputed.
 Chiyo Aizawa murdered her father, who had been raping her for fifteen years, on October 5, 1968, in Japan. The incident changed the Criminal Code of Japan regarding parricide.
 Kip Kinkel (born 1982), an Oregon boy who was convicted of killing his parents at home and two fellow students at school on May 20, 1998.
 Sarah Marie Johnson (born 1987), an Idaho girl who was convicted of killing both parents on the morning of September 2, 2003.
 Dipendra of Nepal (1971–2001) reportedly massacred much of his family at a royal dinner on June 1, 2001, including his father King Birendra, mother, brother, and sister.
 Marie Robards (born 1977) admitted to poisoning her father in 1993.
 Christopher Porco (born 1983), was convicted on August 10, 2006, of the murder of his father and attempted murder of his mother with an axe.
 The Menendez Brothers were convicted during a highly publicized second trial in July 1996 for the shotgun killings of their parents in 1989.
 Karađorđe Petrović (1768–1817), the leader of the Serbian uprising against the Ottoman Empire, and eventual leader of independent Serbia, killed his father Petar around 1786 while the family was fleeing Serbia to the safety of the Austro-Hungarian Empire, after Petar threatened to return to Serbia and betray the family to the Turks.
 Australian Rules Football former player and then-Adelaide Crows senior coach Phil Walsh was murdered in the early hours of 3 July 2015, by his 26-year-old son, Cy.
Alvaro Castillo, shot and killed his father Rafael Castillo before committing a school shooting at Orange High School in North Carolina on August 30, 2006.
 Derek King (age 13) and Alex King (age 12) murdered their father Terry King in Florida in 2001.
 Cesar Correia (born 1960), CEO of InfoLink Technologies, Ltd., killed his father Jaoquim Correia and dumped the body in the Assiniboine River on April 26, 1984. He later confessed to the crime.

Contemporary statistics
In the United States between 1980 and 2010 fathers were more likely than mothers to be killed by their children. Teenage sons (16 to 19 years-old) were most often the perpetrators in parental killings.

See also
 Avunculicide, the killing of one's uncle
 Filicide, the killing of one's child
 Fratricide, the killing of one's brother
 Mariticide, the killing of one's husband
 Matricide, the killing of one's mother
 Parricide, the killing of one's parents or another close relative
 Uxoricide, the killing of one's wife
 Sororicide, the killing of one's sister

References 

Killings by type
Homicide
Fatherhood
 
Death of men
Violence against men
patricides